The Tolima blossomcrown (Anthocephala berlepschi) is a Vulnerable species of hummingbird in the "emeralds", tribe Trochilini of subfamily Trochilinae. It is endemic to Colombia.

Taxonomy and systematics

The Tolima blossomcrown was originally treated as a subspecies of what was then the blossomcrown (Anthocephala floriceps), that also included what is now the Santa Marta blossomcrown. A study by Lozano-Jaramillo et al. published in 2014 found that the two differed greatly both genetically and in their climatic niches. The South American Classification Committee of the American Ornithological Society and worldwide taxonomic systems soon adopted the split; the Santa Marta blossomcrown retained the "parent's" binomial A. floriceps. The Tolima blossomcrown is monotypic.

Description

Both sexes have a straight black bill. The adult male has a buffy white forehead, a rufous chesnut hindcrown, mostly shining green upperparts, and a rusty lower back and uppertail coverts. Its underparts are grayish buff. Its tail is bronzy green with wide white tips to the feathers, and all but the central pair of feathers also have a black bar near the tip. Females and immatures are similar to the adult male but their whole crown is brownish.

Distribution and habitat

The Tolima blossomcrown is found in Colombia's upper Magdalena River Valley where it flows through Cauca, northern Huila, Tolima, and Quindío departments.

Behavior

Movement

The Tolima blossomcrown is assumed to be sedentary, but its possible seasonal elevational movements have not been studied.

Feeding

The Tolima blossomcrown's foraging strategy and diet have not been studied. It is believed to forage low in the forest understory like the Santa Marta blossomcrown.

Breeding

The Tolima blossomcrown's breeding phenology has not been studied.

Vocalization

The Tolima blossomcrown's song is "a long series of repeated tsip notes".

Status

The IUCN has assessed the Tolima blossomcrown as Vulnerable. It has a small range and its population of fewer than 4500 mature individuals is believed to be decreasing. Much of its former habitat has been cleared for agriculture, and remaining forest is fragmented. It does occur in two national parks.

References

Tolima blossomcrown
Birds of the Colombian Andes
Endemic birds of Colombia
Tolima blossomcrown
Tolima blossomcrown